Gertrud Meissner (born 16 April 1895 in Wollin, Pomerania; died 20 November 1985 in Borstel, Holstein) was a German medical doctor.

Biography
Gertrud Meissner studied medicine in Berlin, Jena and Greifswald (1915-1922), qualifying from Greifswald University. She remained at Greifswald until 1927 conducting scientific research at the Institute of Hygiene. In 1928 she received her Ph.D. in bacteriology and hygiene from the University of Breslau (now the University of Wrocław) where she lectured at the Institute of Bacteriological Hygiene. 1935 to 1945 Meissner was head of a medical-diagnostic institute and active at the institute for medical-technical assistants.

Meissner fled post-war Wrocław for  Schleswig-Holstein. From 1948 she was head of the Microbiological Laboratory of Tuberculosis - Research Center Borstel at Hamburg. After 1961 she taught at the Medical Faculty of University of Hamburg as an honorary professor.

She wrote about 200 scientific papers on various problems of medical bacteriology and serology as well as on the chemotherapy of tuberculosis and in 1960 was awarded the Cross of Merit 1st Class of Order of Merit of the Federal Republic of Germany. In 1966 she became an honorary doctor of Kiel University.

In 1965 she received the Robert Koch Medal and Award.

Literature 
 Hans Reddemann: Famous and remarkable physicians from and in Pomerania. Thomas Helms Verlag Schwerin 2003. , p. 114

External links 
 
 Documentation female doctors in the German Empire

References 

1895 births
1985 deaths
20th-century German physicians
20th-century German scientists
20th-century women scientists
20th-century biologists
German women physicians
German bacteriologists
Women bacteriologists
Commanders Crosses of the Order of Merit of the Federal Republic of Germany
People from Wolin (town)
20th-century women physicians
20th-century German women